was an oil tanker that sank in 1975.

In 1972, it was renamed Spartan Lady, and at the time of its loss was flagged in Liberia, owned by Compania Marittma Laconia, and operated by Sea Spartan Steamship Agency.

The United States Coast Guard dispatched four helicopters that arrived about two hours later, by which time the vessel had split in two. The Coast Guard airlifted all 36 crew members from the ship, though one subsequently died en route to shore. The survivors were flown to Coast Guard facilities on Governor's Island in New York and in Hyannis, Massachusetts. Spartan Lady's cargo of 500,000 gallons of oil was spilled into the ocean, though it was driven away from the coastline. It took several days for the wreckage of the ship to sink, and the Coast Guard eventually had to sink the bow section with gunfire.

References

Maritime incidents in 1975
Oil spills in the United States
Oil tankers
1954 ships